Group A of the 2015 FIFA Women's World Cup consisted of hosts Canada, China, New Zealand and the Netherlands. Matches were played from 6 to 15 June 2015.

Teams

Standings

In the round of 16:
Canada advanced to play Switzerland (third-placed team of Group C).
China PR advanced to play Cameroon (runner-up of Group C).
Netherlands (as one of the four best third-placed teams) advanced to play Japan (winner of Group C).

Matches

Canada vs China PR

New Zealand vs Netherlands

China PR vs Netherlands

Canada vs New Zealand

Netherlands vs Canada

China PR vs New Zealand

References

External links
Official website

Group A
Group
2014–15 in New Zealand association football
Group
2015 in Chinese football